The Sons of Odin is a 2006 EP by the American heavy metal band Manowar.

Track listing

The "Immortal Edition" also included a bonus DVD with many features. Included on this DVD was a 5.1-Surround Sound mix of the EP.
The DVD includes highlights of the Manowar convention, an annual meeting of Manowar fans worldwide, a trailer of the Earthshaker DVD and interviews with the band.

References

Manowar albums
2006 EPs
Albums with cover art by Ken Kelly (artist)
Norse mythology in music